Aimaq may refer to:

Aimaq people, a collection of nomadic and semi-nomadic tribes in central and western Afghanistan
Aimaq dialect, a dialect of the Persian language

See also
Aimag, an administrative subdivision of Mongolia, Russia and China